Unida is a Spanish adjective meaning "joined, united" and may refer to:

Unidá, Asturian federation of parties formed by Izquierda Asturiana
Unida, American stoner rock band formed after the dissolution of Kyuss and Slo Burn
Club Atlético Juventud Unida Universitario, football club from San Luis in San Luis Province, Argentina
Esperanza Unida, Inc., non-profit that represents Latino workers in worker's and unemployment compensation hearings
Esquerda Unida, Galician left wing political and social movement
Igreja Metodista Unida, one of the largest Protestant denominations in Mozambique
Igreja Unida, Pentecostal evangelical church in São Paulo, Brazil
Izquierda Unida (disambiguation), eight pages of this name
Juventud Unida de Gualeguaychú, Argentine Football club
Juventud Unida de San Miguel, Argentine Football club
La Raza Unida Party, United States third political party